Charles Guillaume Livet (24 January 1856 – 16 April 1919) was a French playwright, journalist, novelist and physician.

Biography 
A student in hospitals and journalist with L’Événement, Le Temps, Gil Blas, the Voltaire (1883-1891) or, among others, the Journal (1892), he graduated Doctor of Medicine (Paris, 1896) and was distinguished for his research on cancer by applying calcium carbide fragments on cancerous parts and obtained the cessation of pain and bleeding.

As a writer, we owe him theatre plays and romance novels, then, during the First World War, novels about the trenches.

Works 

1882: Le Mariage de Racine, comedy in 1 act, in verse, with Gustave Vautrey
1884: À travers la porte, saynète in 1 act, in verse
1884: Les Petits Pois, comedy in 1 act
1885: Les Récits de Jean Féru, novel
1885: Chez les Martin, saynète in 1 act, in prose
1885: La Sang-brulé, drama in 5 acts and 6 tableaux, with Alexis Bouvier
1885: Théodora à Montluçon, parody in 1 act and 8 tableaux, with Henri Boucherat
1888: Il reviendra, review in 3 tableaux of the year 1887, with Amédée de Jallais
1888: La Vie du marin ballet, pantomime dramatique in 3 acts and 20 tableaux
1895: L'Amour forcé, novel
1896: Emploi du carbure de calcium en chirurgie (et particulièrement dans le traitement du cancer de l'utérus), thesis
1909: Nick Carter, play in 5 acts and 8 tableaux, with Alexandre Bisson
1910: Le Songe d'une nuit d'automne, novel
1912: Fille adoptive, novel
1912: Nouveau manuel de médecine pour tous
1912: Sous le charme, novel
1913: Cœur d'enfant, novel
1913: Coupable par amour, novel
1913: Miramar, l'homme aux yeux de chat, novel
1913: Pietro Danera, le semeur de morts, novel
1914: Épilepsie et troubles vaso-moteurs localisés consécutifs à une fièvre puerpérale
1915: Marraines de poilus, novel
1916: La Faute d'un brave homme, novel
1916: Le Martyre d'une infirmière, novel
1916: Le Portrait de l'aimée, novel
1917: Amour et gloire, novel
1917: Enfant de vierge, novel
1917: Une Larme de poète, one-act play in verse, with Joseph Vassivière
1917: Un Revenant, novel
1918: Cœur de vieillard, novel
1918: Pauvre Mado, novel
1919: L'Enfant aux deux mères novel

Notes

Bibliography 
 Edmond Antoine Poinsot, Dictionnaire des Pseudonymes, 1887, 
 Edmond Benjamin, Paul Desachy, Le Boulevard : Croquis Parisiens, 1893, 
 Henri Avenel, La Presse française au vingtième siècle, 1901, 
 Just Lucas-Championnièrre, Journal de médecine et de chirurgie pratiques, vol.90, 1919,  (obituary)
 Noël Richard, Le Mouvement décadent : dandys, esthètes et quintessents, 1968,

External links 
Guillaume Livet on 

19th-century French dramatists and playwrights
20th-century French dramatists and playwrights
19th-century French journalists
French male journalists
19th-century French novelists
20th-century French physicians
1856 births
Writers from Paris
1919 deaths
19th-century French male writers
20th-century French male writers